Norman Findlay was an English professional football goalkeeper who played in the Football League for Coventry City.

Personal life 
Findlay served as a corporal in McCrae's Battalion of the Royal Scots during the First World War and was released from the army in September 1916 to work in the shipyards.

Career statistics

References 

English footballers
Year of death missing
Year of birth missing
Royal Scots soldiers
English Football League players
Association football goalkeepers
Heart of Midlothian F.C. players
McCrae's Battalion
Blyth Spartans A.F.C. players
Walker Celtic F.C. players
Coventry City F.C. players
Footballers from Newcastle upon Tyne
British Army personnel of World War I